Just Tell Me You Love Me is the soundtrack to the film of the same name, with songs performed by the pop rock duo England Dan & John Ford Coley.

Track listing
All tracks composed by Carol Connors and Dick Halligan, except where indicated.

"Just Tell Me You Love Me"   
"Part of Me, Part of You" (John Ford Coley, Bob Gundry, Dan Seals)       
"I'm Going To Find Tomorrow"    
"Leaving It All Behind" (Coley, Gundry, Halligan, Seals)      
"Movin' On Down The Line" (Coley, Gundry, Seals)    
"Never, Never Night" (Coley, Gundry, Seals)     
"Rainbows For Your Eyes"      
"Life Is Beautiful"     
"Just Tell Me You Love Me" (Instrumental)
"Maui"

Cover versions
In 2009, Filipino-American singer Kris Lawrence recorded with his song from his second studio album Moments of Love.

In 2017, Filipina singer and actress Kathryn Bernardo recorded with her song from her second studio album Lovelife with Kath.

References

England Dan & John Ford Coley albums
1980 soundtrack albums
Film soundtracks
MCA Records soundtracks